Ithomia avella is a Neotropical species of butterfly of the family Nymphalidae.

Description
Wings are transparent with black margins and black  cross-bars on the forewings. The margins of the hindwings show a series of small white spots.

Distribution
This species can be found in NW. Venezuela, Colombia and Ecuador.

Subspecies
 Ithomia avella avella (Colombia)
 Ithomia avella cesleria Hewitson, 1855 (Colombia)
 Ithomia avella epona Hewitson, 1869 (Ecuador)
 Ithomia avella deliciae Fox, 1941 (Colombia)
 Ithomia avella katherineae Fox, 1971 (Colombia)
 Ithomia avella salazari Vitale & Bollino, 2000 (Ecuador)
 Ithomia avella miraculosa Lamas, 2003 (Colombia)

References

 Funet
 Biolib

External links
 Butterflies of America
 Ithomia avella

Ithomiini
Nymphalidae of South America
Butterflies described in 1854